Since the first edition of Carl Linnaeus's Species Plantarum in 1753, plants have been assigned one epithet or name for their species and one name for their genus, a grouping of related species. Related  are in turn grouped into families. Each family's formal name ends in the Latin suffix -aceae and is derived from the name of a genus that is or once was part of the family.

The table below contains seed-bearing families from Plants of the World by Maarten J. M. Christenhusz (lead author), Michael F. Fay and Mark W. Chase, with two updated families from Plants of the World Online. The second column gives the family's original type genus, unless that name is no longer accepted in taxonomic databases. The fourth column gives an associated meaning, derivation or person. 

Key 
LG: derived from a Greek word (G), a Latin word (L), another language (–), or a personal name (P)
Ba: listed in Ross Bayton's The Gardener's Botanical
Bu: listed in Lotte Burkhardt's Index of Eponymic Plant Names
CS: listed in both Allen Coombes's The A to Z of Plant Names and William T. Stearn's Stearn's Dictionary of Plant Names for Gardeners
Gl: listed in David Gledhill's The Names of Plants
Qu: listed in Umberto Quattrocchi's four-volume CRC World Dictionary of Plant Names
St: listed in Stearn's Dictionary of Plant Names for Gardeners
Linked numerical citations in the last column refer to Plants of the World.

Except for Plants of the World, these books list genera alphabetically. "Latin plant name" or "Greek plant name" in the fourth column means that the name appears in Classical Latin or Greek or both for some plant, not necessarily the plant listed here.

Families

See also

 Glossary of botanical terms
 List of Greek and Latin roots in English
 List of Latin and Greek words commonly used in systematic names
 List of plant genera named for people: A–C, D–J, K–P, Q–Z
 List of plant genus names with etymologies: A–C, D–K, L–P, Q–Z

Notes

Citations

References
 
  See http://creativecommons.org/licenses/by/4.0/ for license.
 
 
 
 
 See See https://www.kew.org/science/collections-and-resources/data-and-digital/terms-of-use for license.

Further reading 

 
  Available online at the Perseus Digital Library.
  Available online at the Perseus Digital Library.

Systematic
Greek words and phrases
Systematic
Systematic
Taxonomic lists (families)
Glossaries of biology
Gardening lists
Family names with etymologies
Wikipedia glossaries using tables